Rondo is an unincorporated community in Pittsylvania County, in the U.S. state of Virginia.  Hemp Fork, a tributary to Bearskin Creek, rises northeast of Rondo.

References

Unincorporated communities in Virginia
Unincorporated communities in Pittsylvania County, Virginia